Mohammad Shafi is a former member of the Jammu and Kashmir Legislative Assembly. He represented the Uri Assembly Constituency and was a member of the Jammu & Kashmir National Conference.

He was elected to Jammu and Kashmir Legislative Assembly in 1972 and became the Minister of State for Education in 1977 but in 1987, he became Cabinet Minister for Information, Education and Social Welfare then Cabinet Minister for Agriculture, Rural Development, Cooperative & Panchayat Raj. He introduce Panchayati Raj system in Jammu and Kashmir

He was made Cabinet Minister for Finance and Education. He was sent to Rajya Sabha from 2009 to 2015 but resigned in 2014 as he was reelected as a member of the Jammu and Kashmir Legislative Assembly from Uri in the 2014 election.

References

Jammu and Kashmir MLAs 2014–2018
People from Uri, Jammu and Kashmir
Kashmiri people
Jammu & Kashmir National Conference politicians
Living people
1943 births
Rajya Sabha members from Jammu and Kashmir
Indian Muslims
University of Kashmir alumni
Jammu and Kashmir MLAs 1977–1983
Jammu and Kashmir MLAs 1983–1986
Jammu and Kashmir MLAs 1987–1996
Jammu and Kashmir MLAs 1996–2002